Loulouni is a small town and rural commune in the Cercle of Kadiolo in the Sikasso Region of southern Mali. The commune covers an area of 1,052 square kilometers and includes the town and 28 villages. In the 2009 census it had a population of 38,919. The town of Loulouni, the administrative center (chef-lieu) of the commune, is 41 km north-northeast of Kadiolo on the RN7, the main road between Sikasso and Ouangolodougou in the Ivory Coast. It lies close to Mount Tenakourou on the border with Burkina Faso, the highest point of that country.

References

External links
.

Communes of Sikasso Region